Route 331, also known as Boyd's Cove Highway, is a  east–west highway on the island of Newfoundland in the province of Newfoundland and Labrador. It connects the town of Boyd's Cove with the Gander Bay area of the island.

Route description

Route 331 begins in Boyd's Cove just south downtown at an intersection with Route 340 (Road to the Isles). It winds its way east through rural areas between some lakes to have an intersection with Route 335 (Farewell Road), which provides access to the ferries leading to the Change Islands and Fogo Island. The highway then has an intersection with a short local road leading to Horwood shortly thereafter and dipping southeast for several kilometres. Route 331 begins following the coastline of Gander Bay as it passes through the  communities of Rodgers Cove, Victoria Cove, Wings Point, and Clarke's Head. The highway now makes a sharp turn to the east to cross the Gander Bay Causeway over Gander Bay to enter Gander Bay South and come to an end shortly thereafter at an intersection with Route 330 (Gander Bay Road).

Major intersections

References

331